The 2011 South Sydney Rabbitohs season was the 102nd in South Sydney Rabbitohs's history.

They competed in the NRL's 2011 Telstra Premiership coached by John Lang and captained by Roy Asotasi. The Rabbitohs placed 10th on the competition ladder, after losing a sudden death match against the Knights in Round 26.

The season was the last in the career of coach John Lang, concluding a coaching career spanning 20 years.

Individually, Nathan Merritt received the Dally M Try Scorer of the Year award, finishing equal with the Bulldog's Ben Barba on 23 tries. Chris Sandow received the Dally M Point Scorer of the Year award, after scoring 195 points over the year.

Pre season
In the pre-season the Rabbitohs defeated Newtown in the annual Return to Redfern, before losing to St. George Illawarra in the Charity Shield. Their final trial match against the Titans resulted in a loss.

Regular season

Ladder

Statistics

Kit and Sponsors

Star City Casino
The Star City Casino is the Rabbitohs major home sponsor for the 2011 Telstra Premiership.

DeLonghi
DeLonghi are again the major away sponsor for the Rabbitohs in the 2011 Telstra Premiership.

V8 Supercars Australia
V8 Supercars are the Rabbitohs major sleeve sponsor for the 2011 Telstra Premiership.

Kenwood
Kenwood are the Rabbitohs major training sponsor for the 2011 Telstra Premiership.

playing kit

Sponsors

Squad
The following list comprises players who are in the Rabbitohs full-time first-grade squad for the 2011 season in the NRL Telstra Premiership.

Transfers
Gains

Losses

Player statistics

Representative honours

References

South Sydney Rabbitohs seasons
South Sydney Rabbitohs season